Rachel's were an American chamber music group that formed in Louisville, Kentucky, in 1991. Former Rodan guitarist Jason Noble played music individually and referred to himself as Rachel's but then began collaborating with core members violist Christian Frederickson and pianist Rachel Grimes. The group's work was strongly influenced by classical music, particularly inspired by the minimalist music of the late 20th century, and its compositions reflect this. While the trio formed the core part of the band, the group's recordings and performances featured a varying ensemble of musicians, who played a range of string instruments (including viola and cello) in combination with piano, guitars, electric bass guitar, and a drum set that included a large orchestral bass drum. A key influence on the music of Rachel's was the music of the English composer Michael Nyman, whose music the group's work resembles in both instrumentation and compositional style.

A profile of the band is included in the book Second-Hand Stories: 15 Portraits of Louisville by Michael L. Jones.

Noble died of cancer on August 4, 2012, and Edward Grimes died on March 25, 2017.

Discography
 Handwriting (1995, Quarterstick Records)
 Music for Egon Schiele (1996, Quarterstick)
 The Sea and the Bells (1996, Quarterstick)
 Selenography (1999, Quarterstick)
 Full On Night Split disc with Matmos (2000, Quarterstick)
 Significant Others (2002, Tour-only CD available at ATP)
 Systems/Layers (2003, Quarterstick)
 Technology Is Killing Music EP (2005, Three Lobed Recordings)

Band members
 Christian Frederickson – viola
 Edward Grimes – percussion, vibraphone (deceased)
 Rachel Grimes – piano, organ
 Greg King – vibraphone, djembe, film projections
 Eve Miller – cello
 Jason Noble – guitar, bass (deceased)

Contemporary usage
The Rachel's song "Water from the Same Source" was featured in the movie Hancock, although it did not appear on the official soundtrack, and in the Italian film The Great Beauty. Furthermore, "Water from the Same Source" was featured in Kirby Ferguson's fourth installment of his Everything is a Remix series. Their song "Even/odd" was used in Reha Erdem's film Kosmos. "Lloyd's Register", from the album The Sea and the Bells, made it into the French movie Une liaison pornographique. Their song "An Evening Of Long Goodbyes" provided the inspiration for the title of Paul Murray's novel of that name. The 2017 satirical war film War Machine features "NY Snow Globe".

See also
List of post-rock bands

References

External links
 

Chamber music groups
Musical groups from Louisville, Kentucky
American post-rock groups
Quarterstick Records artists
1991 establishments in Kentucky
Rock music groups from Kentucky
Musical groups established in 1991